H. H. Armstrong was an English first-class cricketer who was a right-handed batsman and a right-arm medium pace bowler.

Armstrong played for Hampshire County Cricket Club in 23 first-class matches between 1882 and 1885. The first came in 1882 against Marylebone Cricket Club. His final first-class match came against Derbyshire in 1885, which was to be Hampshire's final match as a first-class county until the 1895 County Championship. Armstrong made two half centuries with a top score of 68 and took 68 wickets at a bowling average of 20.23. He played other matches for the county side until 1889 as well as for the Gentlemen of Hampshire.

Armstrong lived in Southampton from 1881 to 1889 or 1890.  He played cricket for Southampton until 1888, and his performances were written up in the Hampshire Advertiser.  He worked in a cousin's lamp and oil shop in St. Mary's Street.  He married in 1889 and then moved to London to work with his brothers in a wholesale fruit business.  He had two children a boy and a girl and in 1913 moved to Ringwood Hampshire where he had a wool shop.  He died in 1942, his daughter gave an album of press cuttings and badges to the Hampshire Cricket Museum.

Rferences

External links

English cricketers
Hampshire cricketers
Year of death missing
1862 births